Line 6, also known as the Guangming line of the Shenzhen Metro is in operation. Line 6 is part of the Phase III expansion of the Shenzhen Metro with a construction time frame scheduled for 2015–2019.

It connects Songgang to Shenzhen North station. Construction of the first phase started in 2012, with both the original line and south extension opened on 18 August 2020. Guangming station (formerly known as Cuihu) will have provision for interchange with Dongguan Rail Transit Line 1 which is also under construction. It is envisioned to serve as an interchange with Line 1 and Line 4 of the Dongguan Rail Transit system.

History 
Line 6 had a planning history of over 20 years with major design changes along the way. It was envisioned as an extension of the still under planning Line 1 to connect the industrial and manufacturing centers of the then Bao'an County with the Bao'an Airport and the Special Economic Zones of Shenzhen. At the time Bao'an was not part of the Shenzhen Special Economic Zone, the purpose of Line 6 was to promote the development into Bao'an's western corridor and the northern industrial hinterland by extending the reach of the Shenzhen Metro.

At that point the alignment of Line 6 bears more resemblance to today's Line 11. With the eastern leg of the "∩" replacing one of the then proposed Line 4 branches, the other which remained a section of Line 4 heading to Qinghu. This is the first incarnation of Line 6 that resembles it's alignment today.

In 2011, an additional station, Cuihu (formerly called Lilin), was added between the Guangming Center station and Guangming North station. This was done in anticipation for interchange with Dongguan Rail Transit Line 1 which will now take over the branch line to Dongguan. In order to promote better transport integration and economic development between Dongguan and Shenzhen with the relevant departments of the two cities working together in rail transit planning. During the construction of Line 4 in 2007 to 2011, Shangtang Station reserved space for extra platforms and tracks for cross-platform interchange with Line 6. The station was to be rearranged to accommodate Line 6 when it was being constructed. In addition, Line 4's Longhua depot had supports built with decks designed for Line 6 to run over it. In 2012, Line 6 north of Shenzhen North Station was realigned one block east, dropping the plan to use all these provisions.

On April 10, 2012, Longhua District government held a symposium rail transit construction and the Shenzhen Urban Planning and Land Resources Committee issued the "Shenzhen rail transit planning (revision)". This revised Phase III plan showed that Line 6 will extend further south into central Shenzhen with six new stations, and an additional length of 11.5 kilometers. The Shenzhen Metro Phase III approved by the National Development and Reform Commission does not include the south extension of Line 6. However, in order to reduce the need for passengers heading to the city center to transfer into the already overcrowded Line 4, approval for the southern extension of Line 6 parallel to Line 4 was fast tracked. This extension will improve connectivity, by providing a direct line between Guangming and the city center, and provide relief for the congested Line 4 heading to and from Shenzhen North Station.

Construction 
In 2010 the Shenzhen government and MTR Corporation signed a memorandum of cooperation on the construction operation of Line 6 for 30 years under the BOT procurement strategy, similar to Line 4. Funding was approved in April 2013 and construction of the first phase from Shenzhen North Station to Songgang officially started on August 25, 2015 with completion by June 2020. However, due to later negotiation failures between the two parties, Shenzhen Metro Corporation took over the project themselves without the BOT contract as planned.

A notable feature of the project is the section of Line 6 that crosses over Line 4 between Hongshan and Shangtang stations. The angle between the alignments of the two lines is only 11.3°. This means there is significant overlap between the elevated structures of both lines and Line 6 will need to span 100 meters in length order to cross over Line 4. This will be done with a large cable-stayed bridge supported by a single 92 meter high main pier and a bridge length of 140 meters. Making it the first cable-stayed bridge for a metro line for the Shenzhen Metro.

Construction of the Shenzhen section of Dongguan Rail Transit Line 1 started in 2018 as part of Shenzhen Metro's Phase IV expansion known as the "Line 6 branch line project".

Service routes
  —  (Before 11:00 PM, except working days peak hours)
  —  (Working days peak hours only)
  —  (Working days peak hours only)
  —  (From 11:00 PM to 11:30 PM)
  —  (From 11:00 PM to 11:30 PM)

Stations 
 M - main line services (Before 11:00 PM)
 S1 - Short line services 1 (From 11:00 PM to 11:30 PM)
 S2 - Short line services 2 (From 11:00 PM to 11:30 PM)

Branch

Despite being nominally the branch of Line 6, it is actually a separate line, whose color, train type and train numbers are all separated from those of the main line. The section from Shenzhen Institute of Advanced Technology to Guangming  opened on 28 November 2022, and the section from Guangming to Guangmingcheng is expected to be opened in 2025.

Rolling stock

References 

Shenzhen Metro lines
Railway lines opened in 2020